The Cabinet of Oman is the chief executive body of the Sultanate of Oman. Sultan Haitham bin Tariq, himself is the Prime Minister.

Cabinet
His Majesty Sultan Haitham bin Tariq on 16/06/2022 issued Royal Decree 34/2022 on the formation of the Council of Ministers :

References

External links
Cabinet Ministers from the Ministry of Information, Sultanate of Oman
Oman from the CIA list of Chiefs of State and Cabinet Members
Oman's ruler dismisses ministers, Al Jazeera English, 6 March 2011
Sultan fires ministers amid Oman unrest, Financial Times, 7 March 2011

Oman, Cabinet
Government of Oman